School of the Nations may refer to:
School of the Nations (Guyana)
School of the Nations (Macau) (Portuguese name: Escola das Nações)
School of the Nations (Bahá'í – Brazil) (Portuguese name: Escola das Nações)